Sri Nakhon Lamduan Stadium is a football stadium bearing the  traditional name of the city of Sisaket in Thailand.  It is the home stadium of Sisaket United of the Thai League 3.  The stadium holds 11,200 spectators.

References

External links
Stadium information

Football venues in Thailand
Sisaket F.C.
Sport in Sisaket province
Buildings and structures in Sisaket province